Presidential elections were held in Northern Cyprus on 6 May 1990. Rauf Denktaş of the National Unity Party was re-elected with around two-thirds of the vote.

Results

References

Northern Cyprus
1990 in Northern Cyprus
Presidential elections in Northern Cyprus
May 1990 events in Europe